The 1997 Liga Sudamericana de Básquetbol, or 1997 FIBA South American League, was the second edition of the second-tier tournament for professional basketball clubs from South America. The tournament began on 18 February 1997 and finished on 9 May 1997. Argentine club Atenas won the tournament, defeating Brazilian club Corinthians in the Grand Finals.

Format
Teams were split into three groups of four teams each and one group of three teams, and played each other in a home-and-away round-robin format. The top two teams from each group advanced to the final stage, a best-of-three direct playoff elimination where the champion was decided.

Teams

Group stage

Group A

Group B

Group C

Group D

Final stage

Finals rosters
Atenas Cordoba: Marcelo Milanesio, Greg Dennis, Thomas Jordan, Fabricio Oberto, Diego Osella - Héctor Campana, Leandro Palladino. Coach: Rubén Magnano 

Corinthians: Luiz Augusto Zanon, Robyn Davis, Oscar Schmidt, Brasilia, Caio Silveira. Coach: Zé Boquinha

Season MVP: Greg Dennis

References

1997 South American League for Men's Clubs, FIBA Archive. Retrieved 18 May 2018.

Liga Sudamericana
1997